Zarrin Deh may refer to:
 Zarrin Deh, East Azerbaijan
 Zarrin Deh, Tehran